The Italian Marathon memorial Enzo Ferrari (Italian name: Maratona d’Italia memorial Enzo Ferrari) is an annual marathon race in the Province of Modena, Italy which begins in Maranello and finishes in Carpi. Its inaugural event was held in 1988. The event takes place in October and features both a male and female competition.

History
The competition can be traced back further as editions of the Carpi Marathon were held in 1962, 1969, 1970 and 1985, but these were under the auspices of a separate athletics group and are not considered to be part of the current race's history.

The race's current route from Maranello to Carpi began in 1999, the same year that the competition began its sponsorship arrangement with Ferrari and became known as the Memorial Enzo Ferrari, in honour of the company's founder. Since 2001, a roller skating marathon has also been contested at the same time as the traditional road running marathon.

The race has doubled up as the national Italian marathon championships on a number of occasions. The 2008 edition of the race was dedicated to the centennial anniversary of Dorando Pietri's achievement at the 1908 Summer Olympics in the marathon race. Hungarian runner Anikó Kálovics is the only athlete to have won the race on two occasions.

Past winners
Key:

By country

Other editions
Key:

References
General
Race winners. Association of Road Racing Statisticians (2008-10-16). Retrieved on 2009-10-13.
Marathon Golden Record Book. Italian Marathon. Retrieved on 2009-10-13.
Specific

External links
Official website
Edition summaries from IAAF: 2003, 2004, 2005, 2006, 2007, 2008, 2009

Marathons in Italy
1989 establishments in Italy
Recurring sporting events established in 1989
Carpi, Emilia-Romagna
Sport in Emilia-Romagna
Autumn events in Italy